Imeong is a village in Palau, and the capital of the state of Ngaremlengui. The population is 132 (2009).

Ngeremlengui
Populated places in Palau